Expedition Robinson 1997 was the first version of Expedition Robinson, or Survivor as it is referred to in some countries, to air in the world. This season premiered on 13 September 1997. Martin Melin became the winner on 13 December 1997, with a jury vote of 6–2 over runner-up Kent Larsen.

Despite being the premiere season, the first season was the lowest rated season of the original seven having only garnered around 1.2 million viewers for most of its regular episodes and 2.3 million viewers for its final episode. A major controversy occurred during this season when the first person voted out, Sinisa Savija, committed suicide a month after returning home from the island. Because of this, the first episode to air covered the events between the time when the contestants first arrived on the island and the second elimination.

Following the success of the first season, Åsa Vilbäck, Kent Larsen, and Martin Melin all became well known in Sweden.

Finishing order

Game

In the case of multiple tribes or castaways who win reward or immunity, they are listed in order of finish, or alphabetically where it was a team effort; where one castaway won and invited others, the invitees are in brackets.

 The eighth vote was tied with Erika and Kent each receiving three votes. Following a tied second vote, a lot was drawn which led to Erika's eventual elimination.

Voting history

 At the eighth tribal council both Erika and Kent received three votes. Following a re-vote, there was still a tie. Because of this, both were forced to draw lots to determine who would be eliminated.

References
Footnotes

Sources

External links
SVT - Expedition Robinson
Expedition: Robinson i SVT 1997-2003
5 bästa säsongerna
Veckans resmål: Tengah, Robinsonön
Untitled Document 
Expedition Robinson: Detta har hänt
Robinson 1997-2003

 1997
1997 Swedish television seasons